Kenneth Burns may refer to:

Ken Burns (born 1953), American documentary film producer
Ken Burns (footballer) (1923–2006), Manx footballer
Ken Burns (referee) (1931–2016), English football referee
Kenneth C. "Jethro" Burns (1920–1989), American country musician
Kenny Burns (born 1953), Scottish footballer
"Ken Burns", early alias of Swedish rapper Bladee

See also 
Kenneth Berns, American virologist
Kenneth Burn (1862–1956), Australian cricketer